The second season of the American reality talent show The Voice premiered on NBC on February 5, 2012, in the 10 p.m. ET slot immediately following coverage of Super Bowl XLVI. The first promo aired on NBC on Saturday, October 8, 2011, during an episode of Saturday Night Live.

The program seeks solo artists and duos that perform various types of music: pop, rock, R&B, hip-hop, alternative, Latin, country, blues and indie. Auditions were held July 15 to August 31, 2011, in Chicago, New York, San Francisco, Los Angeles, Houston, Atlanta, Nashville, and Orlando.

All four coaches return for their second season. The season expanded from the first season where each coach has 12 artists (a usual size on almost all seasons) on their team, up from eight as in the first season. The blind auditions and the battle rounds have also been extended. Executive producer Mark Burnett said that a results show would be on Tuesday nights in the spring.

The season premiered on Sunday, February 5, 2012, immediately following Super Bowl XLVI.

Jermaine Paul was named the winner of the season, marking Blake Shelton's first win as a coach. 2 years ago

Auditions

Auditions took place in the following cities:

Coaches and hosts

All four of the original coaches returned for this season. Carson Daly, the host of the show, also returned. Alison Haislip was replaced by singer and actress Christina Milian as the show's social media correspondent, increasing the show's involvement with its fans and offering behind the scenes information and news that would only be given by her. Celebrity guest mentors also worked with coaches during the battle rounds.

Teams
Color key

Blind auditions
Color key

Episode 1 (February 5)

Episode 2 (February 6)
The coaches performed a medley of Prince songs at the start of the show. The songs included were "1999", "Little Red Corvette", "I Wanna Be Your Lover" and "Kiss" which were sung mainly by Christina Aguilera, CeeLo Green, Adam Levine and Blake Shelton respectively.

Episode 3 (February 13)

Episode 4 (February 20)

Episode 5 (February 27)

The Battles
After the Blind Auditions, each coach had 12 artists for the Battle Rounds, which aired from March 5 to March 26. Coaches began narrowing down the playing field by training the artists with the help of advisors.

Color key

The advisors for these episodes are: Alanis Morissette and Robin Thicke for Team Adam; Kelly Clarkson and Miranda Lambert for Team Blake; Kenneth "Babyface" Edmonds and Ne-Yo for Team CeeLo; and Jewel and Lionel Richie for Team Christina. Each advisor is partnered with one artist, for a total of six, as follows:

Live shows

Week 1 (April 2 & 3)
The live performance show aired on Monday, April 2, 2012. The elimination show aired Tuesday, April 3, 2012. The top three artists from each team advances based on the viewers' vote, leaving with the bottom three facing the coaches' save through the participation of Last Chance Performances during the results show. The first live week features Team Blake and Team Christina.

Color key

Week 2 (April 9 & 10)
The live performance show aired on Monday, April 9, 2012. The elimination show aired on Tuesday, April 10, 2012. Similar to the previous week, four artists per team advances, with public votes deciding the top three artists, and the fourth artist advancing through the Last Chance Performances. The second week features Team Adam and Team CeeLo.

Week 3 (April 16 & 17)
The live performance show aired on Monday, April 16, 2012, followed by an elimination show aired Tuesday, April 17, 2012. In a surprise twist, for the next two weeks, for the first time, each coach must make an Instant Elimination, meaning that at the end of the show both coaches must eliminate an artist from their teams. The remaining three artist faces a public vote; the artist with the highest vote advances while the other two artists compete for the coaches' save during the Last Chance Performances. The first week feature Team Blake and Team Christina.
Guest performance: The Wanted – "Chasing the Sun" with Team Blake

Week 4 (April 23 & 24)
The live performance show aired on Monday, April 23, 2012, and results show were aired Tuesday, April 24, 2012. Similar to the previous week, coaches have to instantly eliminate an artist after the performance show, leaving the three remaining artists facing the public vote. The second week feature Teams Adam and Team CeeLo.
Guest performance: Florence and the Machine - "No Light, No Light" with Team CeeLo

Week 5: Semifinals (April 30 & May 1)
The live performance show aired on Monday, April 30, 2012, with the elimination show following on Tuesday, May 1, 2012. In deciding on which artist would represent in the finale, both the coach as well as the public vote made up were given an equal say. Each coach was given 100 points to divide them how they wanted to their respective team artists. The public also had 100 points to be split for the artists of each team. The artist (for the team) which received a higher combined score advances to the finals.

Season one finalists Dia Frampton, Vicci Martinez, Beverly McClellan, and Javier Colon returned on the results show to perform duets (with the exception of Colon). Frampton performed her new single, "Don't Kick the Chair", with Kid Cudi. Martinez partnered with her season one coach CeeLo Green for her song, "Come Along." McClellan joined Cyndi Lauper to perform Lauper's "Money Changes Everything." Colon performed his newest single, "A Drop in the Ocean."

Week 6: Finale (May 7 & 8)
The live performance show aired on Monday, May 7, 2012, with the final results show following on Tuesday, May 8, 2012. Each finalist performed a solo cover song, a duet with their coach, and a song dedicated to the coach.

Note: The golden colored songs are the iTunes top ten bonuses as well as the bolded names.

Elimination chart
Color key
Artist's info

Results info

Performances by guests/coaches

Ratings
Season two premiered following NBC's broadcast of Super Bowl XLVI, and was watched by 37.6 million viewers with a 16.3 rating in the key 18–49 demographic, making it the highest rated Super Bowl lead-out program since Grey's Anatomy in 2006.

Artists' appearances in other media
 Tony Lucca was part of The Mickey Mouse Club with Christina Aguilera.
 Adam Lasher, who failed to turn a chair in the blind auditions, later auditioned for season fourteen of American Idol. He was cut in Hollywood Week. He auditioned again the next season, and advanced to the Top 24.
 Erin Martin appeared on Rock of Love – season two, but was eliminated after the first episode.
 Jamar Rogers auditioned for American Idol – season eight, but his journey ended in the green mile round (top 36 selection).
 Jordis Unga appeared on Rockstar: INXS and finished in 5th place.
 Justin Hopkins appeared on America's Got Talent – season five, but was eliminated in the Vegas Rounds.
 Pip and Mathai both appeared on the casting special of The Glee Project (Episode 0). Pip's placing is unknown, although he was given airtime on the show. Mathai made it into the Top 20, but was not shortlisted for the Top 12.
 WADE was a contestant on American Idol – season ten, advancing to the Las Vegas rounds.
 Erin Willett appeared on seventeenth season of The Biggest Loser, but she finished in Week 11.

References
General

Specific

External links
The Voice Auditions website for 2012

Season 02
2012 American television seasons